Brigadier General Salvador Teodoro Roig Marietti, (November 9, 1907 – July 6, 1984), was the Superintendent of the Puerto Rico Police Department under the Government of Luis Muñoz Marín, and Adjutant General of the National Guard under the Government of Roberto Sánchez Vilella.

Roig was appointed Chief of police of Puerto Rico for a second time in 1963, and he was subsequently appointed to the position of Adjutant General of the Puerto Rico National Guard. Among his accomplishments as a public servant stands have occupied the positions of Chief of Police of Puerto Rico, Military Assistant and Chief of Protocol of La Fortaleza (The Fortress) under the Government of Jesús T. Piñero. He was also exalted in the Puerto Rican Sports Hall of Fame for his exploits in the sport of archery target.

Early years
Roig was born in Yauco, Puerto Rico, to Juan Roig and Angela Marrietti on November 9, 1907. Roig completed his high school education in the UPR's high school. On November 26, 1926, Roig enlisted to the Puerto Rico National Guard. Afterwards, he began his superior education at the Agriculture and Mechanical Arts in Mayagüez, where he joined the ROTC. During this time, Roig also served in Company I of the 295th Infantry Regiment and Company G of the 296th Infantry Regiment, becoming the ranks of second lieutenant and first lieutenant. In 1931, Roig completed his degree in Agricultural Sciences. In June 1936, Roig was promoted to the rank of captain. In 1938, he was selected to attend training at Fort Benning, from where he graduated. He also graduated from the FBI's Training Academy in Washington. Roig married Aida Mejía, with whom he had three children, Salvador II, Angel and Yan.

Education and military career
He earned a bachelor's degree in agricultural sciences in the College of Agriculture and Mechanical Arts (CAAM) of Mayagüez. Started his military career as a private in the Puerto Rico National Guard. In October 1940, Roig was activated to serve in World War II and was placed in charge of Company G of the 296th Regiment which was stationed at Campamento Tortuguero under Gen. Luis Esteves. In January 1941, Roig returned to Fort Benning to attend a course for battalion commanders and other officers, returning to his previous post after completing it. On December 8, 1941, Roig was transferred to Saint a Thomas along several men, where he was given the charge of organize the defenses of the Virgin Islands along the navy. During this time, he was promoted to the rank of commander and was congratulated by the Commander of the Military Department of the Antilles  for his work leading infantry troops. Afterwards, Roig was translated to Puerto Rico and assigned to the 65th Infantry Regiment. While serving in Panama, he was promoted to the rank of lieutenant colonel and assigned as Assistant Director Air Defense at Albrook Air Force Station, 6th Air Force in the Panama Canal Zone. In November 1943, Roig was tasked with commanding the Infantry Units in charge of the defenses in the Galápagos Islands. The following year, after receiving additional training Roig was transferred to Marsella, where he remained until the winter. He then took command of the 65th Regiment and lead them at the Alps, the first time that a fully Puerto Rican unit was led by a local officer in combat. From there, he was assigned to take part in an offensive on March 25, 1944. In September 1945, Roig was promoted to the rank of Infantry Colonel and shortly afterwards the 65th returned to Puerto Rico. Afterwards, Roig was licensed and recruited by colonial governor Rexford Guy Tugwell to serve as Police Chief in 1946.

The next governor, Jesús T. Piñero, tasked him with the offices of Military Adviser and Chief of Protocol for La Fortaleza. He continued as a member of the reserve until 1952. In 1954, he represented Puerto Rico with the Police Shooting Team, being recognized as the most accomplished 12 gauge shotgun shooter. During the Muñoz Marín administration, Roig served as Chief and Superintendent of the Police. In 1964, Roig was inducted to the Puerto Rico Sports Hall of Fame. On March 20, 1966, Roig was named Adjutant General of the PRNG by Roberto Sánchez Vilella.

Legacy
Roig died on July 6, 1984, at the San Juan VA Medical Center in Rio Piedras, Puerto Rico.

The Puerto Rico Police Department Station in Yauco, Puerto Rico was posthumously named after former Puerto Rico Police Superintendent, Salvador T. Roig.

Military awards and decorations
Among Roig's decorations are the following:

Foreign decoration
The Greek Gold Medal of Bravery
Badges:
  Combat Infantryman Badge

Promotions

See also

List of Puerto Rican military personnel
Puerto Rico Adjutant General

References

Citations

Bibliography

1907 births
1984 deaths
People from Yauco, Puerto Rico
Puerto Rican Army personnel
University of Puerto Rico at Mayagüez people
United States Army personnel of World War II
Recipients of the Legion of Merit
United States Army generals
National Guard (United States) generals
Puerto Rican military officers
Puerto Rico Adjutant Generals
Puerto Rican male sport shooters
United States Army reservists
Superintendents of the Puerto Rico Police
20th-century American politicians
Puerto Rico National Guard personnel